The men's tournament of the 2013 World Senior Curling Championships will be held at the Grant-Harvey Centre in Fredericton, New Brunswick from April 13 to 20.

Teams
The teams are listed as follows:

Pool A

Pool B

Round-robin standings
Final round-robin standings

Round-robin results
All draw times are listed in Atlantic Daylight Time (UTC−3).

Draw 1
Saturday, April 13, 8:30

Draw 2
Saturday, April 13, 12:00

Draw 3
Saturday, April 13, 16:00

Draw 5
Sunday, April 14, 8:30

Draw 7
Sunday, April 14, 15:30

Draw 8
Sunday, April 14, 19:00

Draw 10
Monday, April 15, 12:00

Draw 11
Monday, April 15, 15:30

Draw 12
Monday, April 15, 19:00

Draw 13
Tuesday, April 16, 8:30

Draw 15
Tuesday, April 16, 15:30

Draw 16
Tuesday, April 16, 19:00

Draw 18
Wednesday, April 17, 12:00

Draw 19
Wednesday, April 17, 15:30

Draw 20
Wednesday, April 17, 19:00

Draw 21
Thursday, April 18, 8:30

Draw 22
Thursday, April 18, 12:00

Draw 24
Thursday, April 18, 19:00

Draw 25
Friday, April 19, 8:30

Draw 27
Friday, April 19, 15:30

Playoffs

Semifinals
Saturday, April 20, 8:00

Bronze medal game
Saturday, April 20, 14:00

Gold medal game
Saturday, April 20, 14:00

References

External links

2013 in Canadian curling
Curling competitions in Fredericton
2013 in New Brunswick